-drag and -drog is a common Slavic given name word root, drag meaning "dear, beloved", in single-lexemed and dithematic (two lexemes) names.


Examples

Single-lexeme names
Serbo-Croatian Dragan ; Dragana  (with past participle suffix -an)
Serbo-Croatian Dragić  (with diminutive suffix -ić)
Serbo-Croatian Dragica  (with suffix -ica)
Serbo-Croatian Dragoje  (with suffix -oje)
Serbo-Croatian Dragaš  (with suffix -aš)
Serbo-Croatian Dragoš  (with suffix -oš)
Serbo-Croatian Dragiša  (with suffix -iša)
Serbo-Croatian Dragutin  (with suffix -utin)

Dithematic names

Prefixed
Serbo-Croatian Dragimir, Dragomir (from mir, "peace, world")
Serbo-Croatian Dragislav, Dragoslav ; Dragoslava  (from slava, "glory, fame")
Serbo-Croatian Dragivoj, Dragivoje (from voj, "war")
Serbo-Croatian Dragoljub (from ljub, "love, to like")
Serbo-Croatian Dragorad (from rad, "happy, eager, to care")
Serbo-Croatian Dragosav (from sav, "all, every")
Suffixed
Serbo-Croatian Ljubodrag (from ljub, "love, to like")
Serbo-Croatian Milidrag, Milodrag (from milo, "love, to like")
Serbo-Croatian Miodrag (from mio, "tender, cute")
Serbo-Croatian Predrag (from pre, "very, much")
Serbo-Croatian Svedrag (from sve, "all")
Serbo-Croatian Vojdrag, Vojidrag (from voj, "war")
Serbo-Croatian Vukdrag, Vukodrag (from vuk, "wolf")
Serbo-Croatian Živodrag (from živo, "living")

See also
Slavic dithematic names

References

Slavic given names